Duncan Nosahaere Idehen (born 3 July 2002) is an English professional footballer who plays as a defender for EFL Championship side Bristol City.

Having played at academy level for Norwich City, Idehen joined Lincoln City where as well as being a youth team player he appeared twice on the substitute for the first team. In 2019 he joined Grimsby Town and made his full professional debut on the opening day of the 2020–21 season. In January 2022 he joined Bristol City on a six-month contract having briefly featured for Birmingham City in their Premier League 2 campaign. He has since spent time on loan with Carlisle United.

Career

Lincoln City
Having previously played for the academy at Norwich City he joined Lincoln City. During the 2018–19 season although being part of the Imps academy he was named as a substitute in two first team games in the EFL Trophy defeats against Wolverhampton Wanderers and Accrington Stanley.

Grimsby Town
Idehen moved across Lincolnshire and joined Grimsby Town's academy in 2019.
He was offered a professional contract by the club in summer 2020. Idehen made his debut for the club on 8 September 2020, starting a 2–2 EFL Trophy draw with Harrogate Town. He made his league debut on 12 September 2020, starting in a 1–0 League Two defeat away to Walsall.

Following on from Grimsby's relegation from the Football League at the end of the 2020–21 season, Idehen was transfer listed by manager Paul Hurst with the player being made available subject to a sell on clause being activated in any potential deal. On 21 October 2021, having not featured for the first team during the 2021–22 season, Idehen was released from his contract by mutual consent.

Bristol City
Following a spell with Birmingham City's under-23 side, he joined EFL Championship club Bristol City on a six-month contract on 1 January 2022.

Idehen was added to the Robins first team on the 13 February 2022, given the squad number 31 he was named as a substitute in a 3-1 defeat against Swansea City.

On 18 August 2022, Idehen joined Carlisle United on a half-season loan. He scored his first professional goal in an EFL Trophy tie with Fleetwood Town on 20 September 2022, scoring an equaliser in the 90th minute to take the game to penalties in which Carlisle would go on to win.

Personal life
Born in England, Idehen is of Nigerian descent.

Career statistics

References

External links
 
 
 

2002 births
Living people
English footballers
English sportspeople of Nigerian descent
Association football defenders
Lincoln City F.C. players
Grimsby Town F.C. players
Birmingham City F.C. players
Bristol City F.C. players
Carlisle United F.C. players
English Football League players